Guardian Angel is a single by Finnish DJ K-System. It was released in February, 2004, from K-System's album "Sleep is the Enemy". The single has been immensely popular in Finland, having spent 18 weeks on the Finnish Dance Charts, peaking at number 1. It was also very popular among DJs in Scandinavia, and a competition was put in place in 2004, in search of the best remix of the track.

Vocals
 Christa Renwall - a female singer who has worked with other DJs, including Slow. Renwall is also a member of Finnish Acoustic/Rock/Folk band, Acorn.
 Johanna Sandell - a female singer who has done vocal work in other popular Scandinavian dance hits.

Sleep is the Enemy track listing
 L.O.V.E (A Little Piece of Heaven)
 Guardian Angel 
 Oldschool 
 Dream my Dream 
 Sound of Arena 
 Goanna 
 Do You Wanna Ride? 
 Speedfreaks 
 Magic Sunrise 
 Sleep Flower
Bonus Tracks:
 Sound of Arena (Remix) - Liquid M
 Guardian Angel (Remix) - Cosmicman

References

 Discogs Information
 Official K-System website.

Finnish songs
2004 singles
2004 songs